Life Is Toff is a 2014 documentary-style reality television series, following the family of Francis Fulford.

The Fulford family have resided at their Devon country seat, Great Fulford, since the reign of King Richard I. The house is the setting for the six-part documentary following Francis Fulford and his four children: Arthur, Matilda, Humphrey, and Edmund. His wife Kishanda does not appear on camera.

Episode 1: First Born 
Air date 28 October

Episode 2: Bear Up
Air date 4 November

Episode 3: Cheese
Air date 11 November

Episode 4: The Show
Air date 18 November

Episode 5: Murder
Air date 25 November

Episode 6: Ghosts
Air date 2 December

See also
 The F***ing Fulfords

References

External links
 
 

2014 British television series debuts
2014 British television series endings
2010s British reality television series
BBC television documentaries
English-language television shows